Cryptopygus agreni is a species of springtail in the genus Cryptopygus. It is sometime considered a synonym for Hemisotoma pontica (Stach, 1947)

References

Collembola
Animals described in 1903